Edward Selim Atiyah (Arabic: ادوار سليم عطية‎; 1903 – 22 October 1964) was an Anglo-Lebanese author and political activist. He is best known for his 1946 autobiography An Arab Tells His Story, and his 1955 book The Arabs.

He came to England to study at Brasenose College, Oxford University, and there met and married a Scottish woman, Jean Levens. They had four children, including the renowned mathematician, Sir Michael Atiyah, and Patrick Atiyah, an academic and professor of law.

He served as secretary of the Arab League office in London.

Controversy

One quote from his 1955 book, The Arabs, is widely quoted in whole or in part:

This wholesale exodus was due partly to the belief of the Arabs, encouraged by the boastings of an unrealistic Arabic press and the irresponsible utterances of some of the Arab leaders that it could only be a matter of weeks before the Jews were defeated by the armies of the Arab states and the Palestinian Arabs enabled to re-enter and retake possession of their country. But it was also, and in many parts of the country, largely due to a policy of deliberate terrorism and eviction followed by the Jewish commanders in the areas they occupied, and reaching its peak of brutality in the massacre of Deir Yassin. (p. 183)

Part of the above quote has often been used as an evidence of Arab responsibility for the Palestinian exodus in 1948. In the June 16, 1961, The Spectator, Leo Kohn,  professor of political science at Hebrew University and an ambassador-rank adviser to the Israeli Foreign Office used it to support his contention that:

There is also a wealth of evidence from Arab sources to show that the Arab League at an early stage of the campaign adopted a policy of evacuating the Arab population to the neighbouring countries, being convinced that their absence would be of short duration and would facilitate the impending military operations. ...

However, Edward Atiyah came forward to contest this interpretation. In a letter in The Spectator of 23 June 1961, he wrote in a first comment that the passage quoted by Kohn omitted the next sentence: "But it was also, and in many parts of the country, largely due to a policy of deliberate terrorism and eviction followed by Jewish commanders in the area they occupied, and reaching its peak of brutality in the massacre of Deir Yassin.” Having thus referred back to what in his book he considered to be two partial reasons for the exodus, Atiyah then continued, however, in his second comment, to state that there is '"no suggestion whatever in what I wrote that the exodus of the Arab refugees was a result of a policy of evacuating the Arab population. What I said is something quite different from the Zionist allegation that the Arab refugees were ordered or even told by their leaders to evacuate, [...]" 

Death
Atiyah died in 1964 at the age of 61 while taking part in a debate on Arab-Israeli relations at the Oxford Union.

Works (partial)An Arab tells his story: a study in loyalties  ( autobiography ) London: Murray, 1946The Thin Line, 1951 - a crime novel, later issued as Murder, My Love, filmed by Claude Chabrol, called Juste Avant La Nuit, 1971. Onnano nakani iru tanin (The Stranger Within a Woman) by Naruse Mikio, 1966, is also based on this novel. Black Vanguard : Peter Davies: London, UK, 1952Lebanon Paradise. A novel  London: Peter Davies 1953.The Arabs the Origins, Present Conditions, and Prospects of the Arab World, 1955The Crime of Julian Masters Robert Hale, London 1959The Eagle Flies from England Robert Hale, London 1960Donkey From the Mountains Robert Hale, London 1961 - Later issued as:The Cruel Fire''  Doubleday Crime Club 1962

See also
Broadcasts, by Christopher Hitchens

References

External links
 

1903 births
1964 deaths
20th-century British historians
Alumni of Brasenose College, Oxford
Lebanese emigrants to the United Kingdom
Edward